The Pilgrim is a late Jacobean era stage play, a comedy by John Fletcher that was originally published in the first Beaumont and Fletcher folio of 1647.

The play was acted by the King's Men; they performed it at Court in 1621 Christmas season. Since Fletcher's source for his plot, El Peregrino en su Patria (1604), a prose romance by Lope de Vega, was first translated into English in 1621 (from the French translation, not the Spanish original), the play was likely composed and premiered on the stage in that year. The cast list added to the play in the second Beaumont and Fletcher folio of 1679 includes Joseph Taylor, John Lowin, Nicholas Tooley, John Underwood, Robert Benfield, George Birch, John Thompson, and James Horn.

The Pilgrim was both revived and adapted during the Restoration era, as were many of Fletcher's plays. Sir John Vanbrugh made a prose adaptation of Fletcher's verse original that premiered at Theatre Royal, Drury Lane in 1700, with a Prologue, Epilogue, and a "secular masque"  written by John Dryden shortly before his death. The actress Anne Oldfield began her stage career in this production, in the role of Alinda. Vanbrugh's adaptation was also published in 1700, with subsequent editions in 1718 and 1753 (in London), and 1788 (in Dublin).

The play has attracted attention from critics for its portrayal of madmen and their keepers.

References

English Renaissance plays
1621 plays
Plays by John Fletcher (playwright)